Teemu Packalén (born May 22, 1987) is a retired Finnish mixed martial artist. He was the Amateur Champion of Finland and the Finnish Open Championship winner in 2010. Packalén competed in the Lightweight division of the Ultimate Fighting Championship (UFC).

Background
Born and raised in Southwest Finland, Packalén played ice hockey in the C-Junior SM Series and participated in the national team until the age of 17. Packalén started training Brazilian jiu-jitsu in 2007. Packalén trained wrestling when he was young and he won the title for Finland Open Championship in 2010 and third place in European Championships in 2011. Packalén also won the Amateur MMA Championship title in 2012.

Mixed martial arts career

Early career 
Packalén began his professional career competing on the regional circuit in Finland for three years and amassed a record of 7-0 prior joining UFC.

Ultimate Fighting Championship 
Packalén was signed by UFC in July 2015 and he was the fourth Finnish fighter to be part of the UFC roster after Tony Halme, Makwan Amirkhani and Tina Lähdemäki.

For his promotional debut, he was tabbed as a short notice replacement for an injured Jake Matthews on July 18, 2015 at UFC Fight Night: Bisping vs. Leites against Mickaël Lebout. He lost the fight via unanimous decision with the score board of (30-27, 30-27, 29-28).

Packalén was expected to face Łukasz Sajewski on February 27, 2016 at UFC Fight Night: Silva vs. Bisping. However, on 16 February, Sajewski pulled out due to an injury and was replaced by promotional newcomer Thibault Gouti. He submitted Gouti in 24 seconds into round one via a rear-naked choke. This win earned Packalén Performance of the Night bonus award.

Packalén was sidelined with a shoulder injury which entailed a long duration of recovery.

On March 18, 2017, he faced Marc Diakiese at UFC Fight Night: Manuwa vs. Anderson. He lost the fight via knockout in the first round.

Packalén was expected to face Marcin Held on October 21, 2017 at UFC Fight Night 118. However, Packalen pulled out of the fight on October 5 citing a knee injury. 

Packalen was expected to return from his hiatus to face Alexander Yakovlev on April 20, 2019 at UFC Fight Night 149. However on April 4, 2019 it was reported that Packalen pull out for undisclosed reason and he was replaced by Alex da Silva Coelho.

Packalén faced promotional newcomer Ottman Azaitar on September 7, 2019 at UFC 242. He lost the fight via knockout in the first round.

In March 2020, Packalén's contract with the UFC expired. Despite interest from the organization, Packalén was noncommittal on continuing his mixed martial arts career. Later, on November 1, 2021, Packalén announced that he had retired from mixed martial arts.

Personal life 
Packalén and his fiancée Eevi Teittinen, a fitness model from Finland, have a daughter (born 2021).

Championships and accomplishments

Mixed martial arts
Ultimate Fighting Championship
Performance of the Night (One time) vs. Thibault Gouti

Mixed martial arts record

|-
|Loss
|align=center| 8–3
|Ottman Azaitar
|KO (punch)
|UFC 242 
|
|align=center|1
|align=center|3:35
|Abu Dhabi, United Arab Emirates
|
|-
| Loss
| align=center| 8–2
| Marc Diakiese
| KO (punch)
| UFC Fight Night: Manuwa vs. Anderson
| 
| align=center| 1
| align=center| 0:30
| London, England
|
|-
| Win
| align=center| 8–1
| Thibault Gouti
| Submission (rear-naked choke)
| UFC Fight Night: Silva vs. Bisping
| 
| align=center| 1
| align=center| 0:24
| London, England
| 
|-
| Loss
| align=center| 7–1
| Mickaël Lebout
| Decision (unanimous)
| UFC Fight Night: Bisping vs. Leites
| 
| align=center| 3
| align=center| 5:00
| Glasgow, Scotland
|
|-
| Win
| align=center| 7–0
| Suleiman Bouhata
| Submission (guillotine choke)
| Fight Night Finland: Turku Fight Night
| 
| align=center| 1
| align=center| 0:23
| Turku, Finland
|
|-
| Win
| align=center| 6–0
| Hyram Rodriguez
| Submission (kimura)
| Cage 27
| 
| align=center| 2
| align=center| 1:47
| Turku, Finland
|
|-
| Win
| align=center| 5–0
| Sebastian Fournier
| TKO (elbows)
| Cage 26
| 
| align=center| 1
| align=center| 1:53
| Turku, Finland
|
|-
| Win
| align=center| 4–0
| Damien Lapilus
| Submission (heel hook)
| Cage 24
| 
| align=center| 1
| align=center| 2:44
| Turku, Finland
|
|-
| Win
| align=center| 3–0
| Grzegorz Sajbor
| Submission (armbar)
| StandUpWar 4
| 
| align=center| 1
| align=center| 1:58
| Tampere, Finland
|
|-
| Win
| align=center| 2–0
| Konstantinos Persson
| Submission (rear-naked choke)
| Fight for Glory: First Round
| 
| align=center| 2
| align=center| 2:37
| Turku, Finland
|
|-
| Win
| align=center| 1–0
| Grzegorz Szulakowski
| TKO (doctor stoppage)
| StandUpWar 3
| 
| align=center| 1
| align=center| 5:00
| Tampere, Finland
|
|-

See also 
 List of male mixed martial artists

References

External links
 
 

Living people
1987 births
Sportspeople from Turku
Lightweight mixed martial artists
Finnish male mixed martial artists
Mixed martial artists utilizing wrestling
Mixed martial artists utilizing boxing
Mixed martial artists utilizing Brazilian jiu-jitsu
Ultimate Fighting Championship male fighters
Finnish practitioners of Brazilian jiu-jitsu
People awarded a black belt in Brazilian jiu-jitsu